Michael Meeks may refer to:

 Michael Meeks (basketball) (born 1972), Canadian former basketball player
 Michael Meeks (software developer), British software developer